Lundy Braun is professor of pathology and laboratory medicine, and Africana studies at Brown University, United States, who researches history of racial health disparities. She wrote Breathing Race Into the Machine: The Surprising Career of the Spirometer From Plantation to Genetics (2014), which looks at the history of correcting for race in spirometers, and for which she received the Ludwik Fleck Prize in 2018.

Career
Lundy Braun received her PhD from Johns Hopkins Bloomberg School of Public Health in 1982.

Braun studies differences in health relating to race, and is professor of pathology and laboratory medicine and Africana studies. Her reviews of research around algorithms using race adjustments have found that race is not often defined, and she raises the question of the role of race in medicine. Her research paper "Defining race/ethnicity and explaining difference in research studies on lung function", published in the European Respiratory Journal in 2012, looked at almost 100 years of research pertaining to lung disease.

She wrote Breathing Race Into the Machine: The Surprising Career of the Spirometer From Plantation to Genetics (2014), which looks at the history of correcting for race in spirometers, and for which she received the Ludwik Fleck Prize in 2018.

Selected publications
 (Co-author)

References

Living people
American women historians
21st-century American historians
Johns Hopkins School of Medicine alumni
Year of birth missing (living people)
21st-century American women scientists
American pathologists